Catullus 12 is a poem by the Roman poet Catullus.  In it, he chides Asinius Marrucinus for stealing one of his napkins, calling it uncouth and noting the disapproval of his brother, Pollio.  Note the reversal of the praenomen and nomen in the first line. While "Asini Marrucine" could be translated simply as "Asinius Marrucinus", the inverted word order introduces the alternative meaning "Marrucinus [son] of a jackass". Napkins in Ancient Rome were handmade and therefore far more valuable than they are today; also, Catullus has a sentimental attachment to the napkins, as they were a gift from two close friends, Fabullus and Veranius. In comparison to Catullus's other invective poetry, this is relatively light: the main point of the poem could be to praise Pollio rather than to chide Marrucinus.

The meter of this poem is hendecasyllabic, a common form in Catullus's poetry.

Latin text

See also
Latin poetry
Invective

Bibliography

 
 

C012
Articles containing video clips